Hermann Arthur Jahn (born 31 May 1907, Colchester, England; d. 24 October 1979 Southampton) was a British scientist of German descent. With Edward Teller, he identified the Jahn–Teller effect.

Early life
He was the son of Friedrich Wilhelm Hermann Jahn and Marion May Curtiss. He attended City School in Lincoln.

Jahn received his Bachelor of Science degree in chemistry at University College, London in 1928. He received his PhD on 14 February 1935 under the supervision of Werner Heisenberg at the University of Leipzig. The title of his dissertation was "The rotation and oscillation of the methane molecule". From 1935 to 1941 he did research at the Davy Faraday Research Laboratory at the Royal Institution in London.

Career
From 1941 to 1946, he was based at the Royal Aircraft Establishment at Farnborough Airfield. He was (the first) Professor of Applied Mathematics at the University of Southampton from 1949 to 1973. He published scientific papers on quantum mechanics and group theory.

Personal life
He married Karoline Schuler in 1943 in Hendon. They had a son (born 1944) and a daughter (born 1946).
Jahn died in 1979 aged 72.

Honours
Jahn was honoured by a street name in Erfurt during the German Democratic Republic. After the reunification of Germany, this honour was rescinded and the street was renamed.

References
This article has been translated from the article in the German-language Wikipedia.

1907 births
1979 deaths
Alumni of University College London
English chemists
English people of German descent
Leipzig University alumni
Academics of the University of Southampton
People from Lincoln, England